Morag Pirie (born 27 June 1975) is a Scottish association football referee. She is Scotland's first female FIFA referee, having been appointed to FIFA's Elite Development Level in 2012.

In August 2003 Pirie became the first woman to referee a senior football match in Scotland, when she took charge of Huntly's 1–0 win over Wick Academy at Christie Park in the Highland Football League. In November 2003 Albion Rovers manager Peter Hetherston was put on a charge for criticising Pirie's performance running the line in Rovers' defeat to Montrose.

Pirie became the first woman to officiate at a national Cup final in November 2007, when she was an assistant referee at the 2007 Scottish Challenge Cup Final.

References

Living people
Sportspeople from Aberdeen
Scottish football referees
1975 births
Women association football referees
Scottish Football League referees